Anglo American may refer to:

Anglo-Americans, English-speaking inhabitants of Anglo-America
Anglo American plc, mining company
Anglo-American Publishing, former Canadian publisher